Sherif Touré Coubageat (born 27 December 1983) is a former Togolese football forward who last played for Germania Leer.

He represented the Togo national football team in Egypt 2006 Africa Cup of Nations.

External links 

1983 births
Living people
Togolese footballers
Togo international footballers
Association football forwards
Hannover 96 players
Togolese expatriate footballers
Expatriate footballers in Germany
Togolese expatriate sportspeople in Germany
21st-century Togolese people